The fifth season of the American animated television series SpongeBob SquarePants, created by former marine biologist and animator Stephen Hillenburg, aired on Nickelodeon from February 19, 2007, to July 19, 2009, and contained 20 half-hour episodes. The series chronicles the exploits and adventures of the title character and his various friends in the fictional underwater city of Bikini Bottom. The season was executive produced by series creator Hillenburg and writer Paul Tibbitt, who also acted as the showrunner.

The season received high acclaim from media critics and fans. The show itself received several recognition, including the Kids' Choice Awards for Favorite Cartoon in 2007. At the 60th Primetime Emmy Awards, the episodes "The Inmates of Summer" and "The Two Faces of Squidward" were nominated for Outstanding Animated Program (for Programming Less Than One Hour), but lost to The Simpsons episode "Eternal Moonshine of the Simpson Mind". The show won the 2007 BAFTA Children's Awards for the International category. Tom Kenny was nominated at the 35th Annie Awards for Best Voice Acting in an Animated Television Production for his role as SpongeBob SquarePants in the episode "Spy Buddies".

Several compilation DVDs that contained episodes from the season were released. The SpongeBob SquarePants: Season 5, Volume 1 and 2 DVDs were released in Region 1 on September 4, 2007, and November 18, 2008, respectively, while the complete season set was released in Region 2 on November 3, 2008, and Region 4 on November 7, 2008. The first volume was released before the episode "Fungus Among Us" aired in the United States; the second volume was released before the episode "Goo Goo Gas" aired. On November 13, 2012, The Complete Fifth Season DVD was released in Region 1.

Production
The season aired on Nickelodeon, which is owned by Viacom, and was produced by United Plankton Pictures and Nickelodeon Animation Studio. The season's executive producers were series creator Stephen Hillenburg and Paul Tibbitt, who also acted as the series' showrunner. While most episodes consisted of two shorts that were about eleven minutes long or specials that lasted the whole episode, certain episodes were made of one full eleven-minute episode, and two shorts, one of which was seven minutes long and the other only four minutes long. The animation was handled overseas in South Korea at Rough Draft Studios. Throughout the series run, from 1999 to 2008, SpongeBob SquarePants was drawn and animated using pencils. In 2008, the crew shifted and used Wacom Cintiqs for the drawings, instead of pencils. The episode "Pest of the West" was the first episode in the series that the crew used it. Series background designer Kenny Pittenger said that "the only real difference between the way we draw now and the way we drew then is that we abandoned pencil and paper during the fifth season." The crew began the shift while they were working on the episode. Pittenger said that "it was while we were working on 'Pest of the West', one of the half-hour specials, that we made the switch... did you notice?" The shift to Wacom Cintiqs let the designers and animators draw on computer screen and make immediate changes or undo mistakes. Pittenger said "Many neo-Luddites—er... I mean, many of my cohorts—don't like working on them, but I find them useful. There's no substitute for the immediacy of drawing on a piece of paper, of course, but digital nautical nonsense is still pretty fun."

Animation directors credited with episodes in the fifth season included Larry Leichliter, Andrew Overtoom, Alan Smart, and Tom Yasumi. Episodes were written by a team of writers, which consisted of Casey Alexander, Steven Banks, Charlie Bean, Luke Brookshier, Nate Cash, Zeus Cervas, Tim Hill, Tom King, Dani Michaeli, Greg Miller, Chris Mitchell, Mike Mitchell, Richard Pursel, Chris Reccardi, Eric Shaw, Aaron Springer, and Tuck Tucker. The season was storyboarded by Alexander, Bean, Brookshier, Cash, Cervas, King, Miller, Chris Mitchell, Mike Mitchell, Reccardi, Springer, and Tucker.

Cast
The fifth season featured Tom Kenny as the voice of the title character SpongeBob SquarePants and his pet snail Gary. SpongeBob's best friend, a starfish named Patrick Star, was voiced by Bill Fagerbakke, while Rodger Bumpass played the voice of Squidward Tentacles, an arrogant and ill-tempered octopus. Other members of the cast were Clancy Brown as Mr. Krabs, a miserly crab obsessed with money who is SpongeBob's boss at the Krusty Krab; Mr. Lawrence as Plankton, a small green copepod and Mr. Krabs' business rival; Jill Talley as Karen, Plankton's sentient computer sidekick; Carolyn Lawrence as Sandy Cheeks, a squirrel from Texas; Mary Jo Catlett as Mrs. Puff, SpongeBob's boating school teacher; and Lori Alan as Pearl, a teenage whale who is Mr. Krabs' daughter.

In addition to the regular cast members, episodes feature guest voices from many ranges of professions, including actors, musicians, and artists. In the episode "The Original Fry Cook", American comedian and actor Patton Oswalt guest starred as the voice of Jim, a fry cook who had worked at the Krusty Krab before SpongeBob was hired. Oswalt reflected on his voice-over work for the episode, saying "The best part was that I sat next to Clancy Brown in the studio. I'm a big Highlander fan, so to see him do Mr. Krabs was really fun." In the episode "Night Light", Ernest Borgnine and Tim Conway returned to reprise their roles as Mermaid Man and Barnacle Boy, respectively. Bob Joles replaced John Rhys Davies as the voice of Man Ray, as they both previously starred in The Jungle Book 2 as the respective voices of Ranjan's father and Bagheera. It was also guest starred by Mark Hamill as the voice of the Moth. Brian Doyle-Murray reprised his role as the Flying Dutchman for "Money Talks". American film and book critic Gene Shalit made a vocal cameo in "The Krusty Sponge" as his "[fish-]likeness", Gene Scallop. In the special episode and television film SpongeBob's Atlantis SquarePantis, English musician and actor David Bowie guest starred as Lord Royal Highness (LRH). Bowie accepted the role when he was persuaded by his 6-year-old daughter, Alexandria Zahra, who is a fan of the show. Bowie wrote in his blog that he "[is] hit the Holy Grail of animation gigs. We, the family, are thrilled. Nothing else need happen this year, well, this week anyway." In "BlackJack", Marion Ross returned to reprise her role as the voice of Grandma SquarePants. The episode was also guest starred by John DiMaggio as BlackJack SquarePants, SpongeBob's cousin. In "The Inmates of Summer", R. Lee Ermey appeared as the Prison Warden. In the entry "20,000 Patties Under the Sea", American musician and Kiss vocalist Gene Simmons guest starred as the Sea Monster, while his wife, Shannon Tweed, voiced the Mother. Ray Liotta guest starred in the episode "WhoBob WhatPants?" as Trevor, the leader of New Kelp City's Bubble Poppin Boys gang, and the main villain in the episode. In "Banned in Bikini Bottom", Andrea Martin voiced the character of Ms. Gristlepuss. English-American actor and director Christopher Guest voiced Stanley S. SquarePants, SpongeBob's cousin, in the episode of the same name.

Reception
In 2008, Tom Kenny was nominated at the 35th Annie Awards for Best Voice Acting in an Animated Television Production for his role as SpongeBob SquarePants in the episode "Spy Buddies". At the 60th Primetime Emmy Awards, the episode "The Inmates of Summer"/"The Two Faces of Squidward" was nominated for Outstanding Animated Program (for Programming Less Than One Hour), but lost to The Simpsons episode "Eternal Moonshine of the Simpson Mind". At the BAFTA Children's Awards, the show won the International category. At the 2008 Golden Reel Awards, the episode "SpongeHenge" won the Best Sound Editing in Television: Animated category. The show itself received several recognition, including the Kids' Choice Awards for Favorite Cartoon in 2009 and 2010. The series was nominated for the award in 2008, but lost to Avatar: The Last Airbender. The series also won the same category at the Philippines Kids' Choice Awards and Indonesia Kids' Choice Awards, held in 2008 and 2009, respectively. At the 2009 ASTRA Awards, the show was nominated for the Favourite International Program category. Furthermore, the show won the Choice TV Animated Show category at the 2009 Teen Choice Awards.

The season received largely positive reviews from media critics and fans. In his review for DVD Talk, Paul Mavis "highly recommended" the Volume 1 season set, saying "[This] is another winner from Nickelodeon DVD, and a must-have for parents who can't get enough of the braying little yellow sponge. Oh yeah; the kids will probably like it, too." Mavis also praised the voice actors who contributed on the show, and wrote "As funny as the stories are, and in this collection, there are some real gems, I can't stress enough the importance of those voice talents in conveying the unhinged, manic quality that is so integral to the success of SpongeBob SquarePants. In a separate review for the Volume 2 DVD, Mavis only "recommended" the set and wrote "SpongeBob may, and I repeat, 'may,' be starting to level off." He particularly criticized the later entries as "indication of that potential trend."

Roy Hrab of DVD Verdict was positive on the season, but wrote "I do not think that adults will be as entertained as in previous seasons. The comedy is more targeted at the kids than in the past." In particular, Hrab cited the episode "Rise and Shine" as "tiresome (for adults, anyway; kids will enjoy it)." In conclusion, he said "there's nothing new here and adults will be disappointed, but the latest installment of SpongeBob SquarePants delivers a lot of silly and good-natured fun for the kids and there's nothing wrong with that." In the Volume 2 review also for the DVD Verdict, Dennis Prince said "[The season] is not the series' best work but, nevertheless, is an improvement". He added "[It] delivers more of what SpongeBob fans crave."

Episodes

The episodes are ordered below according to Nickelodeon's packaging order, and not their original production or broadcast order.

DVD release
The first 20 segment episodes of the fifth season were released on DVD by Paramount Home Entertainment in the United States and Canada on September 4, 2007. The "Volume 1" DVD release features bonus material including "Bubble Burst Trivia" for "Friend or Foe" and "The Krusty Sponge". The remaining 21 segment episodes of the season were also released under the title "Volume 2" in the United States and Canada on November 18, 2008. In Region 2 and 4, the DVD release for the season was a complete set. On November 13, 2012, The Complete Fifth Season DVD was released in Region 1, three years after the season had completed broadcast on television.

Notes

References

External links

Season 5 at IMDb
Season 5 at Metacritic

2007 American television seasons
2008 American television seasons
2009 American television seasons
SpongeBob SquarePants seasons